Gdynia Literary Prize is a Polish literary prize, which is awarded annually to authors of the best books published in the previous year in the prose, poetry, essay and (since 2014) translation categories.

It was established in 2006 by Wojciech Szczurek, mayor of Gdynia, who stated that "The idea of Gdynia Literary Prize is to honour unique achievements of contemporary Polish authors which shall determine a strong and also permanent impulse to further intensify activities in literature and art in its broad meaning".

The list of nominees is announced in May during the International Book Fair (Międzynarowe Targi Książki) in Warsaw. The prizes which consist of the "Literature Cube" statuette and 50.000 PLN are presented at the Grand Gala in June in Gdynia.
Since 2008 the Grand Gala is accompanied by Literaturomanie Days of Gdynia Literary Prize (Literaturomanie Dni Nagrody Literackiej Gdynia). Moreover, at the turn of October and November, The Autumn Meetings with Winners of the Gdynia Literary Prize take place.

Public City Library (Miejska Biblioteka Publiczna) in Gdynia publishes Literary Supplement. Gdynia Literary Prize Newspaper magazine.

Chapter 

Choices of both the nominees and winners is done by the members of GLP Chapter consisting of prominent experts. The members are: Agata Bielik-Robson, Marek Bieńczyk, Jerzy Jarniewicz, Zbigniew Kruszyński, Małgorzata Łukasiewicz, Aleksander Nawarecki, Violetta Trella (Chapter’s secretary) and chairman Piotr Śliwiński.

In previous years the members were: Alina Brodzka-Wald, Piotr Sommer, Paweł Śpiewak and Elżbieta Gwiazdowska (Chapter's secretary).

Prize winners

„Literaturomanie” Days of Gdynia Literary Prize 

„Literaturomanie” Days of Gdynia Literary Prize (:pl:Dni Nagrody Literackiej Gdynia „Literaturomanie”) - is the full name of two-day festival which debuted in 2008. „Literaturomanie” is the first big, annual literary event in Tricity.

The event is meant for the enthusiasts of high culture in varied literary genres (poetry, prose, essay and commentary). Its goal is to enable the audience to meet with recognized authors with similar profiles of ambitious, contemporary literature (by trend, views, age, sex etc.). The guests who are invited conduct discussions, with each other and with the audience, on the most actual themes. The prominent critics and journalists from patronizing media take care of meritocracy of the debates.

Previous edition of festival

Programs

2008 

Program of “Literaturomanie” 2008 was full of numerous events, such as:
 Author. Author! – meetings with leading Polish authors (the guests were: Wiesław Myśliwski, Eustachy Rylski, Leszek Szaruga, Jacek Żakowski).
 Literary Debates of „Gdynia” – meetings with nominees and readings of fragments of their books.
 Gdynia Drama Prize – presentation of fragments of winning drama and conversation with author.
 Music event – free of charge (Świetliki).
 Open Tournament of One Poem – a combination of poetry and performance during which competitors present their works while the jury (Wojciech Boros, Wojciech Bonowicz oraz Tadeusz Dąbrowski) judge their performance and present the winners (in previous editions: Patryk Dziczek, Joanna Herman, Maciej Kotłowski, Natalia Malek, Anna Wieser, Mariusz Więcek).
 Special movie screenings – and meetings with their creators („Jegomość Tischner i jego filozofia po góralsku”, creators: Witold Bereś, Artur Więcek).
 Second-book Fair – where the best collections can be found.
 Gdynia Literary Prize Vademecum – book stand where books of the nominees can be bought and signatures with dedications can be obtained.
 Poetry Workshops – free of charge classes for 10-15 people which are held by one of prize winners of the previous edition (in 2008 workshops were held by Wojciech Bonowicz).

Moreover, during the festival there are many open debates held with prominent guests such as: Stefan Chwin, Piotr Kłoczowski, Stanisław Rosiek, Krzysztof Środa, Jacek Żakowski.

2009 
In "Literaturomanie" 2009's program which took place on 12–13 June 2009 one could find:

 Author. Author! – meetings with leading Polish authors: Hanna Krall - meeting chaired by Paweł Huelle and Janusz Głowacki, chaired by - Remigiusz Grzela.
 Gdynia zaczytana - photos' exhibition.
 Gdynia Literary Prize Vademecum – book stand where books of the nominees can be bought and signatures with dedications can be obtained.
 Literary Debates of „Gdynia” - meetings with nominees chaired by literary critics and journalists: poetry - Michał Chaciński (TVP Kultura), prose - Andrzej Franaszek (Tygodnik Powszechny), essay - Łukasz Rudziński (trojmiasto.pl).
 :pl:Mumio - performance and meeting with :pl:Mumio.
 Open Tournament of One Poem – third edition; combination of poetry and performance; jury: Leszek Szaruga, Anna Sobecka and Wojciech Boros.
 Prose workshops – free of charge, two-day classes for 10 people, held by Leszek Szaruga
 Second-book fair.
 Two decades of Polish literature - debate on Polish literature after year 1989; participants: Przemysław Czapliński, Ewa Graczyk, Leszek Szaruga, Adam Wiedemann and Marek Zaleski. 
the meeting was chaired by Dariusz Bugalski.

The Autumn Meetings with Winners of the Gdynia Literary Prize
The Autumn Meetings with Winners of the Gdynia Literary Prize (Jesienne Spotkania z Laureatami Nagrody Literackiej Gdynia) – is an event that is held at the turn of October and November which enables further meeting of the enthusiast of culture and art with the Gdynia Literary Prize winners.

Autumn Meetings with „Literaturomanie” Days of Gdynia Literary Prize are platforms where the audience can participate in casual conversations abort literature and listen to interpretations of winners’ books

Previous editions

Notes

External links 
 Official Site
 MySpace Profile
 Grand Gala 2008 gallery
 Literaturomanie 2008 gallery
 The Autumn Meetings 2008 gallery

Gdynia
Polish literary awards
Awards established in 2006
2006 establishments in Poland